Johnny Brennan (born December 1) is an American actor, voice actor, comedian, and writer, known as the creator of the Jerky Boys, which released a series of prank phone call CDs, between 1993 and 1999.

He appears as himself as a member of the Jerky Boys in an episode of Space Ghost Coast to Coast in 1994.

In 1995, Johnny Brennan wrote and starred with Kamal Ahmed in a motion picture portraying the antics of Johnny's Jerky Boys characters called The Jerky Boys: The Movie (the film was shot between April and June 1994). In 1997, Johnny appeared in the Mariah Carey music video "Honey".

Brennan later became known for his voice work in the Emmy-nominated animated series Family Guy, where he performs the voices of Mort Goldman and Horace the bartender of the Drunken Clam.

In 2007, Brennan released Sol's Rusty Trombone  without Ahmed. It was the first Jerky Boys release since 2001. In April, Brennan reprised his role of Frank Rizzo on the animated web series Clock Suckers in the episode "If You Can't Beat 'Em, Then You're a Pussy".

In 2010, Brennan released two iOS apps, titled The Jerky Boys Prank Caller and The Jerky Boys Pinball developed by Inner Four.

Brennan launched The Jerky Boys Show with Johnny Brennan as a free podcast in October 2011. On the show, Brennan discussed the history behind Jerky Boys tracks and allowed fans to call in with questions. Sixteen episodes of the podcast aired before it ended in February 2012. In November 2012, a seventeenth episode was released, featuring a prerecorded interview that had taken place at Gotham Comedy Club in New York City.

Filmography

Film

Television

Video games

References

External links

Living people
American male comedians
21st-century American comedians
American male film actors
American male screenwriters
American male voice actors
Prank calling
21st-century American screenwriters
21st-century American male writers
Year of birth missing (living people)